K. S. Nagarathanamma (1923 – 17 October 1993) was an Indian politician from the southern state of Karnataka. She was elected seven times from the Gundlupet constituency to be member of the Karnataka Legislative Assembly. She was the first female speaker of the Karnataka Legislative Assembly from 1972 to 1978, the erstwhile Mysore Legislative Assembly.

Political career
Before entering politics, Nagarathanamma was vice-president of The Bharat Scouts and Guides and senate member of the University of Mysore. In 1957 when the Gundlupet constituency was formed, she contested the Mysore Legislative Assembly election as independent politician and won the election by securing 24,955 votes whereas her only opponent H. K. Shivarudrappa of Indian National Congress received 13,053. She thus became the first MLA of the constituency. She again defeated Shivarudrappa in 1962 elections winning 22,765 as against his 20,010 votes. She contested the 1967 elections as member of Indian National Congress and defeated K. B. Jayadevappa with a large margin of 21,423 by securing 30,778 as against his 9,355 votes.

Nagarathanamma retained the constituency for the fourth time in 1972 elections defeating B. Basappa of Indian National Congress (Organisation). She won 30,055 votes and Basappa won 20,255 votes. She was elected as the speaker of the assembly in 1972 till 1978 and became the first female speaker of the house. In the 1978 elections she faced defeat when Shivarudrappa, her long time contender, won by a close margin of 271 votes and received 27,141 votes while both were independent candidates.

The 1983 elections again saw her come back to her seat as INC member by defeating H. N. Srikanta Setty of Janata Party and won 44,085 votes. In the following 1985 elections she defeated H. S. Mahadeva Prasad of Janata Party with a large margin of 19,140 securing 40,857 votes for herself. She again defeated Prasad in 1989 elections winning 50,643 votes. Following that she became the Minister for Health and Family Welfare in 1990. She lost the following 1994 elections and Mahadeva Prasad was elected. Prasad went on to win the elections further four times. Nagarathanamma had also served as the leader of opposition and is appreciated for her work as speaker of the house and her working style as opposition leader.

References

1923 births
1993 deaths
Place of birth missing
Missing middle or first names
Indian National Congress politicians from Karnataka
Mysore MLAs 1957–1962
Mysore MLAs 1962–1967
Mysore MLAs 1967–1972
Mysore MLAs 1972–1977
Karnataka MLAs 1983–1985
Karnataka MLAs 1985–1989
Karnataka MLAs 1989–1994